Argina is a village in the Armavir Province of Armenia. The town was named after the Argina Monastery, which is across the border in Turkey.

See also 
Armavir Province

References 

Populated places in Armavir Province